Ghost Train is a BBC Audiobooks original audiobook written by James Goss and based on the British science fiction television, Doctor Who spin-off series Torchwood. The story is set after the second series of the show and was released in March 2011. Kai Owen narrates the story, which is largely set from the perspective of Rhys Williams 

Audiobooks based on Torchwood
Works by James Goss
2011 audio plays